Kasfjord is a village in Harstad Municipality in Troms og Finnmark county, Norway. The Kasfjordvannet lake is located along the east side of the village. The  village has a population (2011) of 252.

References

Harstad
Villages in Troms
Populated places of Arctic Norway